Fr. Agnel Multipurpose School and Jr. College also known as 'Agnels', is a private school in [Juhunagar Vashi], Navi Mumbai, India. Fr. Agnel Multipurpose School was established in the year 1982 in Juhunagar Vashi, Navi Mumbai, with the objective of providing comprehensive education to students up to Higher Secondary Certificate Examination. The school is affiliated with the Maharashtra State Board of Education. The school is consistently ranked amongst the best schools in Mumbai.

Overview 
Fr. Agnel Multipurpose School and Jr. College is a part of the Father Agnel Ashram's family of educational institutions spread across India. It is a co-educational day school with around 5400 students studying in its two campuses, both located in Juhu-Vashi. It is affiliated to the Maharashtra State Board of Secondary and Higher Secondary Education (MSBSHSE). The Multipurpose School was established in 1982 in the imposing School Building constructed by CIDCO in Sector 9A, Juhunagar (Vashi), with the objective of providing comprehensive education from Nursery to Secondary Certificate Examination to children of all classes and communities from Navi Mumbai area.

Current status 
At present, the Institution has two school buildings in two different plots in Sector 9A and Sector 10A, jointly measuring about four acres of land. These buildings-cum-plots have been acquired from CIDCO at the approximate cost of Rupees One Crore. The school (English and Marathi Sections) has been recognised by the Government and is affiliated to the S.S.C. Board, Pune. Presently it has over 4,700 students.

Academics 
Initially when the school was established only classes from kindergarten to 7th standard were operational. Gradually, more classes were introduced. The school now has full-time classes from kindergarten right up to standard 12 (Jr. College).

Besides the mandatory subjects prescribed by MSBSHSE, Fr. Agnel School also has optional courses for Sanskrit and technical subjects like carpentry, electrical maintenance, welding etc. These courses are a unique selling point of this school among other secondary schools in and around Navi Mumbai.

Fr. Agnel Jr College admits students for Biology, Computer Science and Electronics disciplines.

Fr. Agnel is often in the news for academic achievements by its students.

Clubs 
Fr. Agnel has a number of extra-curricular student clubs. Most notable among those are the Astronomy Club, the Gavel Club and the Nature Club.

Sports 

Fr. Agnel claims to have the best of the best sports facilities among schools in India. It is the first school in India to set up a first class-sport costliest artificial turf ground. The sports facility also includes indoor Table Tennis, indoor shooting range, swimming pool, basketball court and badminton court. The Fr. Agnel Stadium (football stadium) has a capacity of around 5,000.

Fr.Agnel Gymkhana has a senior varsity football team which plays in the Super Division MDFA, Mumbai. Agnels had a successful football team in 1996-97-98 but was disbanded after season 1998 due to unknown reasons. Since 2004 the team is functioning again and has gained back to back promotions from 3rd to 2nd to 1st and now the super division in 2011. The major credit goes to the management staff which includes Coach Jerome Dias, Manager Harinder Singh Mall (interim coach: Peter Ochanda). The facilities which are world class have played a major part in the success of the FR. Agnel's Gymkhana team.

Lt coach Dilip Desai had led the Fr. Agnels Chess team in several National and International competitions for the last 20 years. Agnels chess team have consistently come 1st in popular inter school Mumbai tournaments like Bournvita and Parle-G. Students have represented Maharashtra and won in U-19 Girls and Boys National Chess Championship organized by Sports Association of India and received Indian Government Scholarships for their performance from 2001 onwards. Many students have also played Commonwealth games and rated Chess tournaments under AICF (All India Chess Federation).

Since 2010, swimming training has been made compulsory for all students.
Swimmers from Fr. Agnel have won many accolades at district, state and national level. The swimming team under the guidance of Shiv Chatrapti Awardee Gokul Kamath has won medals at various international competitions most notably being the SAF Games and Asian Age Group. The number of nationals medals the Agnel swimmers have won are well over a thousand and they just keep on adding to this already impressive tally.

In football, Fr. Agnel is accredited with first residential FIFA-AIFF Academy in India,

In the past, Fr. Agnel has hosted many national-level tournaments like Indian National Basketball Tournament. In 2010, it hosted the 61st Basketball Junior Nationals tournament.

Other extra-curricular activities 
Fr. Agnel has a compulsory course in Scouts & Guides training for students in standards 8th, 9th and 10th. As a part of the training, students are taken to overnight camps to places in and around Navi Mumbai, like Karnala, Dahanu etc.

Besides, the school also organizes optional trips for students during summer break and Diwali vacations. Over the years, trips have been organized to Lakshadweep Islands, Mauritius, Dubai, Egypt, Kenya, France, Italy, Turkey, Singapore.

See also 
 List of schools in Mumbai

References 

Catholic secondary schools in India
Christian schools in Maharashtra
Junior colleges in Maharashtra
Education in Navi Mumbai
Private schools in Mumbai
1982 establishments in Maharashtra
Educational institutions established in 1982